The 2020–21 Nicholls Colonels men's basketball team represented Nicholls State University in the 2020–21 NCAA Division I men's basketball season. The Colonels, led by third-year head coach Austin Claunch, played their home games at Stopher Gymnasium in Thibodaux, Louisiana as members of the Southland Conference.

Previous season
The Colonels finished the 2019–20 season 21–10, 15–5 in Southland play to finish in a tie for second place. They were set to take on Lamar in the second round of the Southland tournament until the tournament was cancelled amid the COVID-19 pandemic.

Roster

Schedule and results
Due to COVID-19 protocol, Nicholls suspended activities from December 7 through December 26, cancelling five scheduled games.

|-
!colspan=12 style=| Regular season

|-
!colspan=9 style=| Southland tournament

Source

References

Nicholls Colonels men's basketball seasons
Nicholls Colonels
Nicholls Colonels men's basketball
Nicholls Colonels men's basketball